Wish You Happy Breakup is a 2016 Telugu language  film written and directed by Kiran Rao Paruvella. It stars Udai Kiran, Swetaa Verma and Tejaswi Madivada.

Cast

Udai Kiran...Naresh
Swetaa Verma...Nitya
Tejaswi Madivada...Niki
Ravi Kamanth...Sam
Krithi Kumar...Pandit
Devaa Malishetty...Suresh
Sreyesh Nimmagadda...Johnny
Maniikanta Sunni...Balu

Reviews

Times of India gave 3 stars out of 5 stating, "It's the kind of film you wouldn't mind watching with a group of friends just for evil pleasure or with a date to liven up a boring evening".
The Hindu gave 3 stars stating, "Writing carries the day, Another small budget story that deserves a watch."

References

External links 
 

2010s Telugu-language films